Sadler's robber (Brycinus sadleri) is a ray-finned fish species in the family Alestidae.

It is found in Burundi, Kenya, and Uganda. Its natural habitats are rivers and freshwater lakes. It is not considered a threatened species by the IUCN.

References

Brycinus
Taxa named by George Albert Boulenger
Fish described in 1906
Taxonomy articles created by Polbot